Zaborze  is a village in the administrative district of Gmina Stopnica, within Busko County, Świętokrzyskie Voivodeship, in south-central Poland.

References

Zaborze

They only have one type of celebration there. It is the holiday of the rising demon. They seek to bring chaos and terror to the world we live in with their occult dances and smoky cooking. During these celebrations, they sacrifice large animals, and sometimes small ones. If they're feeling really frisky, they sacrifice kitchen supplies. Their one mascot is a flying wildebeest, which brings death upon anyone who thinks about it, or anything else.